Panchajanya is the shankha (conch) of the Hindu preserver deity Vishnu, one of his four primary attributes. The Panchajanya symbolises the five elements, and is regarded to produce the primeval sound of creation when blown.

Literature

Mahabharata 
According to the Mahabharata, Vishnu is stated to have slain a daitya (a member of a clan of asuras) named Panchajana on a mountain named Chakravan constructed by Vishvakarma, and seized the conch shell in which Panchajana had lived for himself. The conch is named after the daitya.

Bhagavad Gita 
In the Bhagavad Gita, the Panchajanya is mentioned:

Harivamsha 
As per the Harivamsha, Krishna, the avatar of Vishnu, is described as possessing a conch shell called Panchajanya, one of his four attributes together with the mace Kaumodaki, the disc-like weapon Sudarshana Chakra, and a lotus. The conch was used during the Kurukshetra War, and is held in popular tradition to have signalled its beginning and end

Skanda Purana 
The Skanda Purana features two origin legends for the conch. 

The Panchajanya is mentioned to be among the various substances and beings that emerged during the Samudra Manthana:

In another legend, Sandipani, the guru of Krishna, Balarama, Sudama, and Uddhava, states that his son was swallowed by a whale at Prabhasa while he was on a pilgrimage, and seeks his return as his dakshina (honorarium). The Ocean itself is stated to have informed Krishna of the existence of a great daitya of the name Panchajana dwelling in its depths, who indeed had swallowed the boy. Krishna slew the daitya who was in the form of a whale, and seized the Panchajanya from within him, which had previously belonged to Varuna. Not finding his guru's son, he descended to Naraka with Balarama and demanded his return. Yama and Chitragupta battled the deities until Brahma intervened, and urged Yama to restore the boy back to life. His desire fulfilled, Brahma eulogised Krishna, prompting him to blow his conch:

Krishna and Balarama then returned the son back to his father, who rejoiced in surprise and hailed their names.

References

Hindu mythology
Vaishnavism
Mythological musical instruments
Hindu iconography